The Aragon motorcycle Grand Prix is a motorcycling event that is part of the Grand Prix motorcycle racing calendar. Its first edition was held in 2010. Between 2022 and 2026, MotorLand Aragón is due to host at least three Grands Prix.

Official names and sponsors
2010: Gran Premio A-Style de Aragón
2011: Gran Premio de Aragón (no official sponsor)
2012–2013: Gran Premio Iveco de Aragón
2014–2015, 2017–2018: Gran Premio Movistar de Aragón
2016: GP Movistar de Aragón
2019–2020: Gran Premio Michelin de Aragón
2021: Gran Premio Tissot de Aragón
2022: Gran Premio Animoca Brands de Aragón

Winners of the Aragon Grand Prix

Multiple winners (riders)

Multiple winners (manufacturers)

Multiple winners (countries)

By year

References

 
Recurring sporting events established in 2010
2010 establishments in Spain